Kimar is a village in northern Syria, administratively part of the Afrin District of the Aleppo Governorate, located northwest of Aleppo. According to the Syria Central Bureau of Statistics (CBS), it had a population of 660 in the 2004 census.

Syrian Civil War

On 4 May 2022, a Turkish soldier was killed after Kurdish forces shelled a Turkish military vehicle in the village.

References

Populated places in Afrin District
Towns in Aleppo Governorate